The Islamic Society of Greater Lowell (ISGL) is a mosque in Chelmsford, Massachusetts, which also serves as a center for lectures and social activities, including a weekly school. The mosque was established in 1993.

Vandals attempted to seal the mosque's door shut with cement in August 2007.

See also
  List of mosques in the Americas
  Lists of mosques 
  List of mosques in the United States

References

External links 

1993 establishments in Massachusetts
Buildings and structures in Middlesex County, Massachusetts
Chelmsford, Massachusetts
Mosques in Massachusetts
Mosques completed in 1993